Humibacter ginsengisoli is a Gram-positive bacterium from the genus Humibacter which has been isolated from soil from a ginseng field in Korea.

References

Microbacteriaceae
Bacteria described in 2015